The Chinese Go Championship is a Go competition which determines the national champion of China.

Outline
The Chinese Go Championship is held with the Swiss system where there are many players who play through 11 rounds. The final two are chosen from whoever has the best 2 records. They then play one game to decide the winner. The komi is 2.75 with Chinese rules. The prize money is 2,500 CY/$300.

Past Winners and Runners-up

The competition was not held in 1961, 1963, 1965, 1967 - 1973, 1976.

Recurring sporting events established in 1957
Go
Go competitions in China